Pietro Marcello (born 2 July 1976) is an Italian film director. He has directed more than eight documentary films since 2004. In 2015 he directed his first fiction film, Lost and Beautiful. Several of his films have been presented at international film festivals and have received various awards and nominations.

Selected filmography

References

External links 

1976 births
Living people
Italian film directors